Leucospilapteryx is a genus of moths in the family Gracillariidae.

Species
Leucospilapteryx anaphalidis Kumata, 1965
Leucospilapteryx omissella  (Stainton, 1848) 
Leucospilapteryx venustella  (Clemens, 1860)

External links
Global Taxonomic Database of Gracillariidae (Lepidoptera)

Acrocercopinae
Gracillarioidea genera